Andrew Powell (born 19 February 1950) is an English guitarist, singer and songwriter. He is a founding member of the British band Wishbone Ash, whose use of twin lead guitars was influential.

Early life and career
He first played guitar at the age of 11, inspired by rock and beat bands such as The Shadows. Powell, unable to muster funds to buy a brand-new guitar, made a Les Paul-style guitar himself, and began to play in London-based bands such as The Dekois and The Sugar Band.

Wishbone Ash
In 1969, Powell answered a Melody Maker classified in which Martin Turner and Steve Upton advertised for a guitar player.  Being unable to choose between Powell and another applicant (Ted Turner), Wishbone Ash was formed with two lead guitarists.

Other appearances
Powell has recorded numerous sessions for other artists, including George Harrison, Ringo Starr, Kashif, Cilla Black, Stewart Copeland and Renaissance.

In 1988, Powell contributed to Miles Copeland III's Night of the Guitar project alongside Ted Turner, touring extensively with artists such as Randy California, Jan Akkerman, Steve Howe, Steve Hunter, Robby Krieger, Leslie West and Alvin Lee.

Personal life
Powell left England around 1980 as a "tax exile", and since then has mainly lived in Redding, Connecticut, with his wife Pauline. They have 3 grown children. 

In 2016 he released his autobiography, entitled Eyes Wide Open: True Tales of a Wishbone Ash Warrior.

References

External links

Wishbone Ash website

1950 births
Living people
Lead guitarists
English male singer-songwriters
English rock guitarists
Wishbone Ash members
Singers from London
People from Hemel Hempstead
English male guitarists